A list of films produced in Brazil in 1985:

See also
1985 in Brazil
1985 in Brazilian television

References

External links
Brazilian films of 1985 at the Internet Movie Database

Brazil
1985
Films